Evgeniya Alexandrovna Burtasova (née Pavlova, ; born 9 July 1993) is a Russian biathlete. She has competed in the Biathlon World Cup since 2018, and represented Russia at the Biathlon World Championships 2021.

Biathlon results
All results are sourced from the International Biathlon Union.

Olympic Games

World Championships
0 medals

References

External links

1993 births
Living people
Russian female biathletes
Sportspeople from Kemerovo Oblast
Universiade medalists in biathlon
Universiade gold medalists for Russia
Universiade silver medalists for Russia
Competitors at the 2015 Winter Universiade
Biathletes at the 2022 Winter Olympics
Olympic biathletes of Russia